Porkovka is a rural locality (a settlement) in Bayunovoklyuchevsky Selsoviet, Pervomaysky District, Altai Krai, Russia. The population was 198 as of 2013. There are 9 streets.

Geography 
Porkovka is located 21 km southeast of Novoaltaysk (the district's administrative centre) by road. Losikha is the nearest rural locality.

References 

Rural localities in Pervomaysky District, Altai Krai